Adams Corner is an unincorporated community in Wabash County, in the U.S. state of Illinois.

Adams Corner bears the name of Daniel Adams, a local pioneer.

References

Unincorporated communities in Wabash County, Illinois
Unincorporated communities in Illinois